Richard Irwin Harrington, Baron Harrington of Watford (born 4 November 1957) is a British politician and businessman. From the 2010 general election until the 2019 general election, he was the Member of Parliament (MP) for Watford. He was the Minister for Business and Industry from June 2017 to March 2019. Harrington had the Conservative whip removed on 3 September 2019, but on 29 October he was one of ten MPs to have it restored.

On 8 March 2022, Harrington was appointed Minister of State for Refugees, with his ministerial portfolio being in charge of co-ordinating the UK’s response to the humanitarian crisis caused by Russia’s invasion of Ukraine. He was also elevated to the House of Lords after being given a Life Peerage. In August 2022, the government announced that, under Harrington’s leadership, a total of 104,000 Ukrainian war refugees had been given safe refuge in the UK. On 4 September 2022, Harrington stepped down from the role, having completed the task of putting in place a permanent system for arrivals. 

In November 2022, he was awarded the Spectator Magazine’s ‘Peer of the Year’ Award at its annual Parliamentarian of the Year Awards. The following month he was also listed on the Sunday Times Alternative Honours list for his work settling Ukrainian refugees.

Early life
Harrington was born on 4 November 1957 in Leeds to a British Jewish family. His father sold clothes from a market stall and a shop. He was privately educated at Leeds Grammar School, going up in 1976 to Keble College, Oxford University, where he studied Jurisprudence. While at Oxford, he sat on the Executive Board of the Federation of Conservative Students and was a member of the National Union Executive of the Party. He began his career in business with a graduate scheme at the John Lewis Partnership, where he eventually became the assistant to the managing director of Waitrose; this included a period working at Trewins Department Store in Watford.

Career
In 1983, he founded Harvington Properties, a property development company, with two friends from university. In 1990, Harrington became a shareholder and managing director of LSI Leisure Syndicates International a company active in the development, sales and management of holiday resorts in both the UK and Europe. The company was sold to a listed American company at the end of the decade and is now owned by Hilton Hotels. Other notable work in property development included the restoration of one of Glasgow's most famous hotels, One Devonshire Gardens.

Harrington supports a range of charities and has been a trustee of the Variety Club Children's Society. He is also trustee of several charities in Watford.

After leaving Westminster in 2019, Harrington took on on the role of Senior Advisor and Chairman of APCO UK, and  membership of the international board of APCO Worldwide, a global company offering strategic consultancy and political advice to governments and corporations. In February 2021 Harrington was appointed Senior Advisor to the Investment Banking Group of Canaccord Genuity. On being reappointed to the government on 8 March 2022, Harrington resigned his business positions at APCO and Canaccord Genuity.

In January 2021 Harrington was appointed by the Department for Culture, Media and Sport as a trustee of the Royal Albert Hall.

Politics

Harrington is a long-time member of the Conservative Party, in which he has played an active part since 1983, and long-time supporter of Kenneth Clarke. Until March 2010, he was chairman of the Executive Board of the Conservative Friends of Israel, which, during his tenure, had quadrupled in size financially. He was appointed a treasurer of the Conservative Party in 2008, the role in which he launched the Number 10 Club with Sir John Major.

Harrington won the Watford seat from Claire Ward at the 2010 general election with a majority of 1,425 votes. He was the first of the new MPs elected at the 2010 general election to make his maiden speech in the Commons.

Since his election to Parliament, Harrington has also been elected as General Secretary of the All Party Parliamentary Kashmir Group (until 2015), Vice Chairman of the All Party Parliamentary Film Industry Group, and a member of the International Development Select Committee between July 2010 - November 2012. He has run a number of successful community projects in Watford including six jobs fairs and a Community Exchange. His main areas of interest are cutting local unemployment, supporting business in the constituency and progressing the significant infrastructure projects in Watford including the redeveloping Watford Junction and the Watford Health Campus. In September 2012, Harrington was appointed as a Vice Chairman of the Conservative Party. In the 2012-13 Parliamentary Session, Harrington successfully brought in a Private Members Bill to criminalise the unlawful subletting of social housing property.

In May 2015, Harrington was re-elected as the Member of Parliament for Watford, with a majority of 9,794 votes, increasing the Conservative share of the vote by 8.5%. A month later, in June 2015, Harrington was appointed as the Prime Minister's apprenticeships adviser. 

Harrington was appointed Parliamentary Under Secretary of State at the Department for Work and Pensions in Theresa May's first Cabinet reshuffle on 17 July 2016, with his former position left vacant and effectively abolished.

At the 2017 snap general election, Harrington was re-elected with a reduced majority of 2,092 votes. Harrington was moved to the Department for Business, Energy and Industrial Strategy in the subsequent Cabinet reshuffle.

Having helped secure Government funding for the Croxley Rail Link Harrington expressed frustration with Labour's Sadiq Khan, the Mayor of London, for not progressing the project in February 2018; despite Harrington securing an extra £73,000,000 of government funding. In response Labour representatives argued that central government funding should have been provided for a project located outside of London and that "a more balanced approach, seeking the Department for Transport and TfL to work closely together is what is needed".

In early-2019, Harrington warned of the risks of a no-deal Brexit. On 25 March 2019, he resigned from the government to vote for Oliver Letwin's amendment.

On 1 April 2019, Harrington became the sixth Conservative MP to express his support for a second referendum on Brexit.

On 29 August 2019, Harrington announced via Twitter that he would not stand for re-election in the next general election.

Harrington remains an active Conservative and is President of Watford Conservative Association as well as supporting candidates in marginal constituencies.

Alternative medicine
In June 2010, he supported and signed an early day motion in support of the continuation of National Health Service funding for homeopathy, a motion sponsored by Conservative MP David Tredinnick.

House of Lords
Harrington was appointed by the Prime Minister to the post of Minister of State for Refugees on 8 March 2022, working across both the Department for Levelling Up, Housing and Communities and the Home Office, as part of the Response to the Russian Invasion of Ukraine.

He was made a life peer with the name, style and title  of Baron Harrington of Watford, of Watford, in the County of Hertfordshire, on 15 March 2022. He was introduced to the House of Lords on the same day.

Notes

References

External links
 Richard Harrington MP Official website
 Watford Conservatives
 
 Electoral history and profile at The Guardian
 The Register of Members' Financial Interests, House of Commons Publications, at 6 September 2010

 

1957 births
Living people
Alumni of Keble College, Oxford
Conservative Party (UK) MPs for English constituencies
Independent members of the House of Commons of the United Kingdom
English businesspeople
English people of Jewish descent
Politicians from Leeds
Politics of Watford
UK MPs 2010–2015
UK MPs 2015–2017
UK MPs 2017–2019
Jewish British politicians
Conservative Party (UK) life peers
Life peers created by Elizabeth II
Free Enterprise Group